Repulsive guidance molecule A (RGMa) is a bone morphogenetic protein (BMP) co-receptor of the repulsive guidance molecule family. Together with BMPR1A and BMPR1B, as well as ACVR2A and BMPR2, it binds BMPs thereby activating the intracellular SMAD1/5/8 signalling pathway. In humans this protein is encoded by the RGMA gene.

Function 

RGMa is a repulsive guidance molecule for retinal axons.  Furthermore, neogenin functions as a receptor for RGM. Neogenin overexpression and RGM downexpression in the developing embryonic neural tube induces apoptosis. The apoptotic activity of neogenin in the neural tube is associated with cleavage of its cytoplasmic domain by caspases.

RGMA belongs to a family of repulsive guidance molecules that are (glycosylphosphatidylinositol)-linked cell-membrane-associated proteins. The three proteins, RGMa (this protein), RGMb and RGMc are 40-50% identical to each other, and share similarities in predicted protein domains and overall structure. All three RGM proteins appear capable of binding selected BMPs (bone morphogenetic proteins).

RGMs may play inhibitory roles in prostate cancer by suppressing cell growth, adhesion, migration and invasion. RGMs can coordinate Smad-dependent and Smad-independent signalling of BMPs in prostate cancer and breast cancer cells. RGMa is also pointed as a component of the mechanisms that determine skeletal cell fusion via neogenin receptor.

References

Further reading

Genes on human chromosome 15
Receptors